Lemsane is a town in the Batna Province of north-eastern Algeria.

Communes of Batna Province
Algeria
Cities in Algeria